Aeroméxico Flight 110 was a scheduled domestic commercial flight from Acapulco to Guadalajara. On November 8, 1981, the McDonnell Douglas DC-9 operating the flight experienced a cabin decompression and crashed near Zihuatanejo while initiating an emergency descent, killing all 18 people on board.

Aircraft 
The aircraft involved was a DC-9-32 that was delivered to Aeroméxico in 1974 and was named Tijuana. It was powered by two Pratt & Whitney JT8D-17 turbofan engines.

Accident 
After departing Acapulco and reaching . The captain reported to air traffic control that the aircraft's cabin had depressurized and requested to return to Acapulco for an emergency landing. The aircraft initiated an emergency descent but at  it crashed into the Sierra de Guerrero mountains.

Investigation 
The investigation determined that the crew had failed to follow the emergency procedures.

References 

Aviation accidents and incidents in 1981
Aviation accidents and incidents in Mexico
110
Accidents and incidents involving the McDonnell Douglas DC-9
1981 in Mexico
Airliner accidents and incidents involving in-flight depressurization
Airliner accidents and incidents caused by pilot error